Blood Brothers: Malcolm X & Muhammad Ali is a 2021 American documentary film made for Netflix and directed by Marcus A. Clarke. The film is based on the book Blood Brothers: The Fatal Friendship Between Muhammad Ali and Malcolm X by Randy Roberts and Johnny Smith. It tells the story of the friendship and deterioration thereof between American boxer Muhammad Ali and human rights activist Malcolm X, which is depicted through archival footage and interviews with friends of the two men. It was released on September 9, 2021.

References

External links 

2021 films
2021 documentary films
Films about Muhammad Ali
Films about Malcolm X
Documentaries about historical events
Documentary films about race and ethnicity in the United States
Documentary films about sportspeople
Documentary films about boxing
Biographical documentary films
American sports documentary films
2020s English-language films
2020s American films